Chilam Joshi Festival is a religious festival celebrated by the Kalash people, living in the Chitral District of Khyber Pakhtunkhwa province in Pakistan. The festival starts on 13 May.

Activities 
The four-day festival is held in the middle of May. During the festival, men and women meet with the aim of finding a spouse. The festival provides an opportunity to celebrate the beginning of summer and to give a message of peace to the world. During Chilam Joshi, the men and women of Kalash pray for the safety of their fields and animals and dance to traditional music and the beat of drums.
The Government of Pakistan's Ministry of Religious Affairs and Interfaith Harmony has been mandated to sponsor the celebration of important religious festivals of the minority communities in Pakistan in each year. The government's official celebration of the festival has been held since 2017 at the village of Bamburate, Chitral.

References

External links 
 
 Kalash Chilam Joshi Festival - Hunza Guides Pakistan
 Chilam Joshi Festival - Chitral
Festivals in Pakistan